Ravenia is a genus of flowering plants in the citrus family, Rutaceae.

The genus name of Ravenia is in honour of Jean François Ravin (18th century), a French doctor, professor of botany and medicine at the University of Coimbra in Portugal.

Known species
According to the United States Department of Agriculture and the Agricultural Research Service, GRIN:
Ravenia biramosa
Ravenia pseudalterna
Ravenia rosea
Ravenia spectabilis  
Ravenia swartziana
Ravenia urbanii – tortugo prieto

References

Ravenia
Zanthoxyloideae genera